The 1987–88 season was Real Madrid Club de Fútbol's 86th season in existence and the club's 57th consecutive season in the top flight of Spanish football.

Overview
Real Madrid finished the season as champions for the third season running, claiming the club's 23rd league title overall. Los Blancos finished 11 points ahead of the runners-up, that this time were Real Sociedad. However, Madrid lost to the Basque side in the Copa del Rey semi-finals 0–5 on aggregate and were knocked out at the same stage of the European Cup by PSV Eindhoven.

Squad

Transfers

In

 from Atlético Madrid
 from Valencia CF
 from Real Murcia
 from Real Madrid Castilla
 from Real Madrid Castilla
 from Real Madrid Castilla

Out

 to Málaga CF
 to Real Zaragoza
 to Sevilla FC

Competitions

La Liga

Results by round

League table

Matches

Copa del Rey

Fifth round

Eightfinals

Quarter-finals

Semi-finals

European Cup

First round

Second round

Quarter-finals

Semi-final

Statistics

Squad statistics

Players statistics

See also
La Quinta del Buitre

References

Real Madrid CF seasons
Real Madrid CF
Spanish football championship-winning seasons